Văcăria River may refer to:
 Văcăria, a tributary of the Brătei in Dâmbovița County, Romania
 Văcăria, a tributary of the Pilug in Hunedoara County, Romania
 Văcăria, a tributary of the Putna in Suceava County, Romania

See also 
 Pârâul Vacii (disambiguation)
 Văcărești (disambiguation)